La Cruz is a town and seat of the municipality of La Cruz, in the northern Mexican state of Chihuahua. As of 2010, the population of 1,671 is up from 1,318 in 2005.

References

Populated places in Chihuahua (state)